Libecina is a municipality and village in Ústí nad Orlicí District in the Pardubice Region of the Czech Republic. It has about 200 inhabitants.

Administrative parts
The village of Javorníček is an administrative part of Libecina.

References

Villages in Ústí nad Orlicí District